North Tyrone was a constituency of the Parliament of Northern Ireland.

Boundaries
North Tyrone was a county constituency comprising the northern part of County Tyrone. It was created when the House of Commons (Method of Voting and Redistribution of Seats) Act (Northern Ireland) 1929 introduced first-past-the-post elections throughout Northern Ireland. North Tyrone was created by the division of Fermanagh and Tyrone into eight new constituencies, of which five were in County Tyrone. The constituency survived unchanged, returning one member of Parliament until the Parliament of Northern Ireland was temporarily suspended in 1972, and then formally abolished in 1973.

The seat was dominated by the town of Strabane, and also included parts of the rural districts of Castlederg, Omagh, and Strabane.

Politics 
The constituency was consistently won by members of the Ulster Unionist Party. Nationalists from various groups contested the seat on two occasions, twice winning more than 40% of the vote, and an independent and two members of minor parties also stood. The remaining elections were uncontested.

Members of Parliament

Election results 

At the 1929 Northern Ireland general election, William Thomas Miller was elected unopposed.

At the 1930 by-election and the 1933 Northern Ireland general election, James Gamble was elected unopposed.

At the 1943 by-election and the 1945 Northern Ireland general election, Thomas Lyons was elected unopposed.

At the 1953, 1958, and 1962 Northern Ireland general elections, Thomas Lyons was elected unopposed.

References

Northern Ireland Parliament constituencies established in 1929
Constituencies of the Northern Ireland Parliament
Historic constituencies in County Tyrone
Northern Ireland Parliament constituencies disestablished in 1973